Sir Robert Hugh Le Masurier (29 December 1913 – 30 July 1996) was Bailiff of Jersey from 1962 to 1974.  He was knighted in the 1966 Birthday Honours.

References
Philip Jeune, "Obituary: Sir Robert Le Masurier", The Independent, 2 August 1996.
Profile on Guernsey Society website.

Bailiffs of Jersey
Knights Bachelor
1913 births
1996 deaths